Ludhiana College of Engineering and Technology (LCET), Katani Kalan, Ludhiana is one of the prestigious institutes for Engineering and Management studies in India. It is affiliated to IKG PTU (IKG Punjab Technical University) and AICTE. It was the first college in IKG PTU to offer Automobile Engineering as an undergraduate course.

Location 
It is situated on Ludhiana-Chandigarh Highway, Katani Kalan, Ludhiana, PIN-141113, Punjab, India,  at 35 km distance from Ludhiana and 72 km from Chandigarh via Ludhiana-Chandigrah Highway.

Mission 
Institute emphasizes on all round development of its students. It aims at not only producing good professionals, but also good and worthy citizens of a great country aiding in its overall progress and development.
To treat every student as an individual, to recognize his/her potential and to ensure that he/she receives the best preparation and training to help one meet one's career ambitions and life goals.

Vision & Mission 
Shaping a better future for mankind by developing effective and socially responsible individuals and organization.

Courses Offered 
 BBA
 MBA
 BCA
 MCA
 B.Tech.
 M.Tech.
 B. Com. (prof.)
 BSc (IT)

Branches 
 Electronics and Communication Engineering
 Mechanical Engineering
 Computer Science Engineering
 Information Technology
 Civil Engineering
 Automobile Engineering

Post Graduate Courses 
 M.Tech. in Electronics and Communication Engineering (Full Time)
 M.Tech. in Electronics and Communication Engineering (Part Time)
 M.Tech. in Computer Science & Engineering (Part Time)
 M.Tech. in Production Engineering (Part Time)
 MBA in HR, Finance, Marketing and IT

External link 
 Official website

Education in Ludhiana
Science and technology in Ludhiana